Adria Tennor is an American actress, writer, and director. She is best known for her work in the film The Artist (2011), as well as the television series Greek, Mad Men, and Mad Dogs.

Life and career

Adria was born in Royal Oak, Michigan. She graduated from New York University Tisch School of the Arts and Playwrights Horizons Theater School with a BFA in acting and stage directing. She began her career playing a twelve-year-old boy opposite Martin Donovan in Hal Hartley’s Amateur (1994). In 2006, she wrote and starred in the one-woman show, StripSearch, about finding love and happiness with the help of a pole.

In 2018, Adria wrote, directed and produced a short film, Pie starring herself, Chloe Lanier and Jessica Paré. In 2020, she partnered with Kristen Tracy, to launch the short-format series, Fetish, which she co-created, directed and produced.

Personal life
In 2006, Adria married restaurateur Claudio Blotta and the two opened four restaurants together. They divorced in 2022.

Filmography

Film

Television

Awards and nominations

References

External links 
 
 

American film directors
American male screenwriters
American film producers
21st-century American actresses
American child actresses
American film actresses
American television actresses
Living people
Year of birth missing (living people)